Synnex was an American multinational corporation that provides information technology (IT) services to businesses. It merged with competitor Tech Data to form TD Synnex. It was founded in 1980 by Robert T. Huang and based in Fremont, California. As an information technology supply chain services company, it offered services to original equipment manufacturers, software publishers and reseller customers.

History 
Originally founded as a technology hardware distributor, Synnex distributes products and related logistics services. As a business process outsourcing and contract assembly it works with industry suppliers of IT systems, peripherals, system components, software and networking equipment.  The company is one of the major employers in Greenville, South Carolina. On 21 December 2009, Synnex acquired Jack of All Games from Take-Two Interactive. In December 2010 Synnex acquired the managed business solutions division of e4e, an ITes service provider located in Bangalore in India.

In 2012 Hyve Solutions announced a partnership with IBM and Zettaset to produce a bundled "turnkey" platform for Hadoop-based analytics targeted to the needs of small- and medium-sized businesses. Synnex acquired IBM's worldwide customer care business process outsourcing (BPO) services business on 11 September 2013.

In June 2017, Synnex acquired the North and Latin American operations of Westcon-Comstor, along with 10% of the remaining part of Westcon (Westcon International) from Datatec for a reported consideration of up to $830 million.

On 28 June 2018, Convergys and Synnex announced they have reached a definitive agreement in which Synnex would acquire Convergys for $2.43 billion in combined stock and cash, and integrate it with Concentrix. On 5 October 2018, Convergys Corporation and Synnex announced that they have completed the merger.

In 2019, Synnex sits at number 158 on the Fortune 500 listing.

On 9 January 2020, Dennis Polk, President and Chief Executive Officer of Synnex, announced plans to separate SYNNEX and Concentrix into two publicly traded companies. The spinoff was completed on 1 December 2020, with Synnex shareholders getting one share of Concentrix for each share of Synnex they held.

In July 2020, the Republican National Convention's servers were hacked through Synnex. The company said it "could potentially be in connection" with the Kaseya VSA ransomware attack that unfolded days prior.

On 22 March 2021 it was announced that Synnex will merge with Tech Data for a sum of 7.2 billion USD, including debt. Synnex shareholders received 55% of the merged company. MiTAC Holdings Corp. and its affiliates, which collectively owns about 17% of Synnex shares as of 22 January 2021, voted their shares in favor of the transaction.

Merger with Tech Data 
On September 1, 2021, Synnex completed a merger with Tech Data. This merger created a new company with $59.8 billion in revenue, TD Synnex. Through the combination of both companies, TD Synnex becomes the largest IT distributor, surpassing Ingram Micro. TD Synnex is led by former Tech Data CEO, Rich Hume.

References

Companies listed on the New York Stock Exchange
Consulting firms established in 1980
Companies based in Fremont, California
Information technology consulting firms of the United States
International information technology consulting firms
Outsourcing companies
American companies established in 1980
Technology companies established in 1980
2021 mergers and acquisitions